Kerascoët is the joint pen name of the French illustrators, comics and animation artists Marie Pommepuy (born 1978) and Sébastien Cosset (born 1975).

A married couple, they met while attending the Olivier de Serres art school. They chose their pen name in 2000 after the hamlet of Kerascoët in Névez, Brittany where Pommepuy grew up.

Kerascoët have worked on numerous bandes dessinées as well as the animated television series Petit vampire and in advertisement. Several of their comics have been published in English by NBM Publishing, to critical acclaim. They were nominated for an Eisner Award for their comic Beautiful Darkness, and for the Ignatz Award for Outstanding Graphic Novel for Beauty.

Works
 Anita O'Day, Editions Nocturne, 2001
 Donjon Crépuscule, written by Lewis Trondheim and Joann Sfar, Delcourt:
 Volume 104 : Le Dojo du Lagon, 2005
 Volume 105 : Les Nouveaux Centurions, 2005
 Miss Pas Touche (Miss Don't Touch Me), written by Hubert, Dargaud:
 Volume 1 : La Vierge du bordel, 2006
 Volume 2 : Du sang sur les mains, 2007
 Volume 3 : Le prince charmant, 2008
 Volume 4 : Jusqu'à ce que la mort nous sépare, 2009.
 Jolies Ténèbres (Beautiful Darkness), written by Marie Pommepuy and Fabien Vehlmann, Dupuis, 2009
 Cœur de glace, written by Marie Pommepuy, art by Patrick Pion, Dargaud, 2011
 Beauté (Beauty), written by Hubert, Dupuis: 
 Volume 1 : Désirs exaucés, 2011
 Volume 2 : La reine indécise, 2012
 Volume 3 : Simples mortels, 2013
 Voyage en Satanie, T.1, written by Fabien Vehlmann, Dargaud, 2011.
Les Tchouks, written by Benjamin Richard, Rue de Sèvres, 2014–
 Volume 1 : On a fait une cabane, 2014
 Volume 2 : On a vu la mer !, 2014
 Malala's Magic Pencil written by Malala Yousafzai, 2019
The Bug Girl, written by Sophia Spencer with Margaret McNamara, Schwartz & Wade Books, 2020
De cape et de mots, written by Flore Vesco, Dargaud, 2022.

References

External links

French illustrators
French comics artists
Collective pseudonyms
21st-century pseudonymous writers
Writing duos
1970s births
Living people